The acronym CFTH may represent:

 CFTH-FM-1, a radio station in Harrington Harbour, Quebec, Canada
 Coalition for the Homeless, an American non-profit group
 Compagnie Française Thomson-Houston